MS  Moby Drea is a cruiseferry, currently owned by the Italy-based shipping company Moby Lines and operated on their Genoa–Olbia service. It was built in 1975 by Flender Werke, Lübeck, West Germany as MS Tor Britannia for Tor Line. Between 1991 and 2003 it sailed as MS Prince of Scandinavia.

History

Tor Line service

Tor Line was established in 1966 by two Swedish companies to operate car-passenger services between Sweden, England and the Netherlands with modern car-passenger ferries. By the early 1970s Tor Line had essentially defeated their main competitors on the route, Rederi AB Svea and Swedish Lloyd. To consolidate their leading position the company decided to order a pair of new state-of-the-art ferries for the service. The new ships were to be the fastest ferries in the world, as well as largest, except for the Soviet Union's Belorussiya class ships.

MS Tor Britannia was delivered on 16 May 1975 and entered service on 21 May. Construction had begun on its sister ship, to be called MS Tor Scandinavia, in April. Tor Scandinavia was eventually delivered on April 12, 1976. The two ships revolutionized trans-North Sea traffic, being capable of speeds in excess of 27 knots and offering services hitherto unknown on ferries in that route. Although technically modern in many ways, the ships' exteriors were quite traditional in their style, reminiscent more of ocean liners than ferries. The sole exception to this were two massive loading ramps in the rear of the ship, which were necessary as the ships had no forward car-gate (just a small car door on the forward starboard side for upper car deck exit only) for safety reasons.

During their service with Tor Line, the two ships alternated  on the routes Gothenburg–Felixstowe and Gothenburg–Amsterdam.

It soon turned out there weren't in fact enough passengers for both new ships during the winter season. As a result, Tor Line chartered the Tor Scandinavia as an expo ship in January–February 1979 (to Holland Expo for use in the Middle East), again in January–April 1980 (to Scan-Arab Expo for a fair cruise around the Middle East and Asia) and again in December 1980 – April 1981 (again to Holland Expo for use in the Middle East). The winter passenger numbers weren't the only problem, and Tor Line started looking to form a partnership with another shipping company. In January 1980 Sessan Tor Line was formed as a collaborative company between Tor Line and Sessan Line, another Swedish company that had traffic between Gothenburg and Frederikshavn, Denmark. As a result, Sessan Line's mermaid-logo was added alongside Tor Line's logo in the Tor ships' funnels. Sessan Tor Line proved to be short-lived however, and in April 1981 the collaboration ended.

DFDS / Scandinavian Seaways service

In December 1981 Tor Line was sold to the Danish company DFDS. The only immediate change was that the ships' home port was altered from Gothenburg to Esbjerg, Denmark. They soon received DFDS's white hull and dark funnel colours (as opposed to the dark hull and white funnel of Tor Line), but were officially marketed as DFDS Tor Line ships due to the good reputation of Tor Line in Sweden. In 1983 DFDS decided to abandon the line to Amsterdam completely, and use only one ship—Tor Scandinavia—on the Gothenburg to Harwich route, whereas the Tor Britannia sailed from Harwich to Esbjerg.

In 1988 DFDS adopted a new marketing name, Scandinavian Seaways, for their passenger division. As a result, the Tor Britannia was painted in a new, attractive white/blue livery, but the change also meant disappearance of the name Tor Line from its hull. In the same year the ship was moved to Danish International Shipregistry, which meant lower operational costs for the company.

In 1990 it received a new name, MS Prince of Scandinavia, to bring it in line with Scandinavian Seaways' other ships.

Moby Lines service

In 2003 Moby Lines took over the Prince of Scandinavia in Frederikshavn, Denmark, and it was renamed M/S Moby Drea. Originally it was reported that the Moby Drea would open a new route for Moby Lines, connecting Genoa and Porto Torres. With the MS Moby Otta it serves the Livorno–Genoa route from the end of may until the end of October.

References

External links 

  Tor Scandinavia at Fakta om Fartyg
 Moby Lines company website

Cruiseferries
Ships built in Lübeck
1974 ships